Frost/Nixon is a 2006 British historical play by screenwriter and dramatist Peter Morgan based on a series of controversial televised interviews of the same name that former U.S. President Richard Nixon had granted English broadcaster David Frost in 1977 about his administration, including his role in the Watergate scandal that ultimately led to his resignation.

Performance history
The play premiered at the Donmar Warehouse theatre in London in August 2006, directed by Michael Grandage and starring Michael Sheen as the talk-show host and Frank Langella as the former president. Frost/Nixon received enthusiastic reviews in the British press. It then played at the Gielgud Theatre in London's West End, again starring Langella and Sheen.

On March 31, 2007, the play began previews on Broadway. It officially opened as a limited engagement at the Bernard B. Jacobs Theatre on April 22 and closed on August 19, after 137 performances. The cast included Langella, Sheen, Remy Auberjonois (John Birt), Shira Gregory (Evonne Goolagong), Corey Johnson
(Jack Brennan), Stephen Kunken (James Reston Jr.), Stephen Rowe (Swifty Lazar/Mike Wallace), Triney Sandoval (Manolo Sanchez), Armand Schultz (Bob Zelnick) and Sonya Walger (Caroline Cushing).

TimeLine Theatre Company in Chicago ran the play from August 21 to October 10, 2010.

In regional theatre, Frost/Nixon made its Ohio premiere at the Rabbit Run Theatre in Madison, Ohio. The U.S. Rocky Mountain regional premiere was directed and designed by John Thornberry for Longmont Theatre Company in Longmont, Colorado, and ran from November 4 to 19, 2011.

The show received its Philadelphia premiere with New City Stage Company December 5, 2013 to January 4, 2014. The show was a combination of the stage play and the screenplay for the film Frost/Nixon and received wide acclaim.  Dan Olmstead, who portrayed Richard Nixon, received a Barrymore Award nomination, and Russ Widdall, who portrayed David Frost, received a citation from Philadelphia Weekly for one of the 2014's most notable performances.

Awards and nominations

Original Broadway production

Feature film

Ron Howard directed a 2008 film adaptation of the play. The film was produced by Imagine Entertainment and Working Title Films for Universal Pictures. Shooting began on August 27, 2007. Langella and Sheen reprised their roles for the film.

References

External links
 Official sites:
 The Original Interviews Website
 London production
 
 
 Michael Billington, Frost/Nixon, The Guardian,(London) 22 August 2006
 Paul Taylor, "Frost/Nixon, Donmar Warehouse, London: Closing shots convey the drama of a TV classic", The Independent (London), 22 August 2006
 Charles Spencer, "Brief but gripping encounters", The Telegraph (London), 23 August 2006
 Benedict Nightingale, Frost/Nixon, The Times Online (London), 22 August 2006
 Ben Brantley, "When David Faced a Wounded Goliath", The New York Times, 23 April 2007  (Broadway production)
TimeLine Theatre Company, Chicago: Frost/Nixon Study Guide Retrieved 2011-10-02

2006 plays
Docudrama plays
English plays
British plays adapted into films
Plays based on actual events
Cultural depictions of Richard Nixon